Anatoly Shvidenko is a doctor of science, professor, and senior research Scholar at the International Institute for Applied Systems Analysis, Austria.

Anatoly Shvidenko worked at the National University of Life and Environmental Sciences of Ukraine from 1968 to 1987, where he headed the Department of Forestry Inventory and Planning.  He joined the IIASA's Forestry Program in October 1992 and has been principal investigator in a number of projects on the forest sector of Northern Eurasia, including projects financed by the European Commission, European Space Agency, and other international organizations (such as Siberia, Siberia-II, GSE-FM, IRIS, Enviro-RISK, and Zapas).

Professor Shvidenko's main fields of interest are forest inventory, monitoring, mathematical modeling, global change, and boreal forests. He served as lead author and coordinating lead author in the Third Millennium Ecosystem Assessment and in the second, third, and fourth IPCC Assessments (the work of the IPCC, including the contributions of many scientists, was recognised by the joint award of the 2007 Nobel Peace Prize).

He has taken part in a number of important international global change activities and initiatives as member of steering committees and councils (Global Terrestrial Observing System Terrestrial Carbon Observation Panel, FAO Forest Resource Assessment, International Boreal Forest Research Association, Scientific Council of the World Commission on Forestry and Sustainable Development, Siberian National Committee on IGBP, etc.) Shvidenko is a member of the Board of International Boreal Research Association (IBFRA).

Bibliography
He has authored and coauthored over 400 scientific publications, including 14 books in English, Russian and Ukrainian languages. h-index of articles in English is 23.

  Cited 12 times

  Cited 124 times

 

 

 

  Cited 97 times
 
  Cited 396 times
  Cited 126 times

  Cited 74 times

References

External links 
"Forests can store more carbon emissions than earlier thought" News One, July 15, 2011 
"Wald speichert deutlich mehr CO2 als angenommen" Kleine Zeitung, July 14, 2011
"New Boreal Forest Biomass Maps Produced from Radar Satellite Data" ScienceDaily, June 11, 2010

1937 births
Living people
People from Zhashkiv
Russian ecologists
Russian foresters
Ukrainian ecologists
Austrian foresters
Laureates of the State Prize of Ukraine in Science and Technology